Tigh Siah may refer to:
 Tigh Siah, Hormozgan
 Tigh Siah, Kerman